"Body Bumpin' (Yippie-Yi-Yo)" is a song by American R&B group Public Announcement. It was released as the first single from their debut studio album All Work, No Play (1998). It became Public Announcement highest charting song on the US Hot 100 chart where it peaked at number 5. The song made the Top 40 chart in the UK, peaking at number 38. This is the first song released by the group without singer R. Kelly.

Music video
The video is directed by Public Announcement. There is both a video for the remix and the original.

Formats and track listings
 Digital download
 "Body Bumpin' (Yippie-Yi-Yo)" – 4:33
 "Body Bumpin' (Yippie-Yi-Yo) [R&B Remix]" – 5:29
 "Y To the Yippie (Step On)" – 5:27
 "Body, Bumpin' (Yippie-Yi-Yo) [Mike Dunn's Deep Soul Bump Mix]" – 8:07
 "Body Bumpin' (Yippie-Yi-Yo)" [DJ Kelly G's House Mix] – 8:14

Credits and personnel
Credits adapted from AllMusic.

 Feloney Davis – Composer, Primary Artist
 Euclid Gray – Composer, Primary Artist
 Monica Gray – Composer, Primary Artist

Charts and certifications

Weekly charts

Year-end charts

Certifications

|}

References

1998 singles
1998 songs
A&M Records singles